Giancarla Trevisan (born 17 February 1993) is an American-born  Italian female sprinter who won one national title at senior level. She also won two bronze medals at international senior level with the Italian national track relay team.

Biography
Her father is Italian migrated in USA. Opted from Italian citizenship from 2017. She lives in Los Angeles with her American husband Corey Butler, married in the spring of 2018.

National records
 Mixed 4 × 400 metres relay: 3:16.15, Yokohama, 11 May 2019 (Davide Re, Giancarla Trevisan, Andrew Howe, Raphaela Lukudo); current holder

Achievements

National titles
Italian Athletics Championships
400 m: 2019

See also
 Italian all-time top lists – 4×400 metres relay
 Naturalized athletes of Italy

References

External links

1993 births
Living people
Italian female sprinters
American emigrants to Italy
Citizens of Italy through descent
Italian people of American descent
American people of Italian descent
World Athletics Championships athletes for Italy
Italian Athletics Championships winners
Athletes (track and field) at the 2022 Mediterranean Games
Mediterranean Games gold medalists in athletics
Mediterranean Games gold medalists for Italy